The Serbian Hockey League Season for 1994-1995 was the fourth season of the league. This was the first season in which HK Vojvodina participated in, since the end of the former Yugoslavia. Four teams participated, each one playing four games with one another, resulting in twelve games for each team. HK Partizan won all the games that it played that season, resulting in them winning the regular division. They went on to win the playoffs. It was their second title since the end of the former Yugoslavia.

Teams
HK Partizan
KHK Crvena Zvezda
HK Vojvodina
HK Spartak Subotica

Regular season standings

Playoffs

Semifinals
Partizan defeated Spartak in a best of three series. Spartak could not participate after the first game, so Partizan won by default.
Partizan-Spartak 22:2
Partizan-Spartak 5:0 (forfeit)
Partizan-Spartak 5:0 (forfeit)

Crvena Zvezda defeated Vojvodina in a best of three series, winning 9-1 and 9-3.

Finals
Partizan swept the finals.
Partizan-Crvena Zvezda 10:1
Partizan-Crvena Zvezda 5:1
Partizan-Crvena Zvezda 9:3

third place
Vojvodina ate Spartak... 15-3 14-2 22-3

cup competition
There was also the competition for the cup.

semi-finals
Partizan beat Vojvodina 12-3
Spartak lost to Red Star 5-7

cup finals
Partizan - Red Star 6-3

Games
The list is incomplete, including only one third of the games played.
Partizan-Vojvodina 3:2
Partizan-Crvena Zvezda 9:2
Partizan Spartak 26:1
Partizan-Vojvodina 10:4
Partizan-Crvena Zvezda 4:0
Partizan Spartak 11:2
Partizan-Vojvodina 8:1
Partizan-Crvena Zvezda 4:0
Partizan Spartak 17:1
Partizan-Vojvodina 12:4
Partizan-Crvena Zvezda 4:0
Partizan Spartak 13:1

External links
 Sezona 1994/95

Serbian Hockey League
Serbian Hockey League seasons
Serb